Kyffhäuserkreis I – Eichsfeld III is an electoral constituency (German: Wahlkreis) represented in the Landtag of Thuringia. It elects one member via first-past-the-post voting. Under the current constituency numbering system, it is designated as constituency 10. It covers the western part of Kyffhäuserkreis and a small part of Eichsfeld district.

Kyffhäuserkreis I – Eichsfeld III was created for the 1994 state election. Since 2019, it has been represented by Stefan Schard of the Christian Democratic Union (CDU).

Geography
As of the 2019 state election, Kyffhäuserkreis I – Eichsfeld III covers the western part of Kyffhäuserkreis and a small part of Eichsfeld district, specifically the municipalities of Abtsbessingen, Bellstedt, Clingen, Ebeleben, Freienbessingen, Greußen, Großenehrich, Helbedündorf, Holzsußra, Niederbösa, Oberbösa, Rockstedt, Sondershausen, Thüringenhausen, Topfstedt, Trebra, Wasserthaleben, Westgreußen, and Wolferschwenda (from Kyffhäuserkreis), and Niederorschel (only Deuna, Gerterode und Vollenborn) from Eichsfeld.

Members
The constituency has been held by the Christian Democratic Union since its creation in 1994. Its first representative was Günter Grüner, who served from 1994 to 2009, followed by Gerold Wucherpfennig (2009–2014), Manfred Scherer (2014–2019), and Stefan Schard (2019–present).

Election results

2019 election

2014 election

2009 election

2004 election

1999 election

1994 election

Notes

References

Electoral districts in Thuringia
1994 establishments in Germany
Kyffhäuserkreis
Eichsfeld (district)
Constituencies established in 1994